I Believe is the fifth studio album of European-based Nigerian artist Dr. Alban. It was released on 1 October 1997.

Track listing
Intro (3:43)	
"Guess Who's Coming to Dinner" (feat. Michael Rose) (3:44)	
"Mr. DJ" (3:37)	
"Soon Come" (3:33)	
"Feel the Rhythm" (4:18)	
"Enemies" (3:33)	
"Long Time Ago" (3:27)	
"I Believe" (3:47)	
"Oh Baby" (3:13)	
"Show Me" (3:36)	
"Mountains" (3:18)	
"Humpty Dumpty" (2:32)	
"Love Affair" (2:52)	
"Honey Bunny" (3:18)	
"Ain't No Stopping" (3:11)	
"Raggamuffin Girl" (3:33)	
"Oh Baby" (Sly & Robbie Mix) (3:12)

Charts

References

1997 albums
Dr. Alban albums